In algebraic geometry, a symmetric variety is an algebraic analogue of a symmetric space in differential geometry, given by a quotient G/H of a reductive algebraic group G by the subgroup H fixed by some involution of G.

See also
Wonderful compactification
Homogeneous variety
Spherical variety

References

Algebraic geometry